Ropsten is a cape at the eastern part of Stockholm mainland at the inner part of Stockholm archipelago in Sweden. Two bridges named Lidingöbron extend from Ropsten over to the island of Lidingö. Ropsten area is located between Hjorthagen and the Stockholm city main port Värtahamnen. Ropsten is the terminal station for the eastern part of Stockholm Metro system and is also the terminal station for Lidingöbanan, the railway for public transportation, covering the area of Lidingö.

History
Ropsten has been the communication center for the traffic between Stockholm and Lidingö since the 13th or 14th century, when the first inhabitants settled on Lidingö and began farming, 200–300 years after the end of the Viking Age.

The name "Ropsten" stems from the fact that in old times, going back to the 13th or 14th century, people used to shout out loud from this area to Lidingö, a distance of about 750 meters, to call for a boat transport over to Lidingö, before the first regular rowboat ferry line was introduced and before the first bridge was built. In the old times, the part of the Ropsten area close to the waterfront was  named Ropudden (corresponding to "cape shout"). The large rock or islet in the water close to this cape gave the place its name, "the rock at cape shout", Ropsten. The rock itself, however, was probably not used as a place to shout from, as it was surrounded by water (during average sea level conditions) according to old maps from the end of the 17th century, in particular a map from 1696. When there was an extreme low sea level it was probably possible to reach the rock by foot, as indicated on the painting by Piere Joseph Trere from 1795.

The entire area, named Ropsten, dramatically changed appearance in just a few years when the first bridge between Ropsten and Lidingö and the main port for Stockholm was built in this area from around 1884. Today nothing remains of the old Ropsten as it appears on the painting from 1795.

Image gallery, Ropsten year 1696-2008

Footnotes

Geography of Stockholm